Keithley Instruments is a measurement and instrument company headquartered in Solon, Ohio, that develops, manufactures, markets, and sells data acquisition products, as well as complete systems for high-volume production and assembly testing.

In September, 2010, the company agreed to sell itself to the Danaher Corporation, a Washington, D.C.-based conglomerate, for $21.60 per share.  It was soon merged with Tektronix, Inc, which had been acquired by Danaher in 2007, and now exists wholly as a brand of Tektronix.

History
Joseph F. Keithley founded Keithley Instrument in 1946. His first product, the "Phantom Repeater," amplified low-level electric signals so that they could be measured by more standard equipment. The device was used by physicists, chemists, and engineers in the development of hearing aids and amplifiers. The product enjoyed some success in sales, but it was the next product, an electrometer, that clinched the future for Keithley's fledgling company.

General 
The company designs, develops, manufactures and markets electronic instruments and systems geared to the specialized needs of electronics manufacturers for production testing, process monitoring, product development, and research.

The company has approximately 500 products used to source, measure, connect, control or communicate direct current (DC), radio frequency (RF), or optical signals. Product offerings include integrated systems solutions, instruments, and personal computer (PC) plug-in boards that can be used as system components or as stand-alone solutions.

The company's markets are engineers, technicians, and scientists in manufacturing, product development, and research functions.

Keithley operates throughout North America, Asia, and Europe. It develops new solutions for the broader electronics industry, as well as electronic manufacturing production test, semiconductor, telecommunications/wireless and research/education.

Products 

Keithley Instruments' major product lines included testing and measurement products such as electrometers, voltmeters, signal generators, data acquisition, and production and benchtop parametric testers and analyzers.

Historical highlights 
 1946 - Founded in Cleveland, Ohio, U.S.A., by Joseph F. Keithley
 1950 - First employee hired
 John Yeager, the first employee, died January 10, 2018.
 1964 - Moved headquarters to Solon, OH
 1966 - German office opened
 1967 - UK office opened
 1991 - Joseph P. Keithley becomes chairman
 1995 - Listed on New York Stock Exchange
 1998 - Taiwan office opened
 2000 - Korea office opened
 2003 - Santa Rosa, California RF Design center opened (sold to Agilent Technologies 2009)
 2005 - Singapore office opened
 2009 - S600 Series parametric test product line discontinued
 2010 - Agreed to sell itself to the Danaher Corporation, many operations merged with Tektronix
 2011 - Announcement that most manufacturing will shift from Ohio to China

References

External links 

 
 "Understanding Current Switching’s Special Needs". Cigoy, Dale. Electronic Products. 2009.
 "Standards Help Ensure Order for Nanotechnology". Tucker, Jonathan. Evaluation Engineering. June 2009.
 "Low Level Measurements Handbook: Precision DC Current, Voltage, and Resistance Measurements". Keithley Instruments, Inc. 7th edition, 2016.

Technology companies established in 1946
Technology companies disestablished in 2010
Electronic test equipment manufacturers
Defunct companies based in Ohio
1946 establishments in Ohio
2010 disestablishments in Ohio
American companies established in 1946
American companies disestablished in 2010